Vanessa Lee Carlton (born August 16, 1980) is an American singer-songwriter and pianist. After completing her education at the School of American Ballet, Carlton chose to pursue singing, performing in New York City bars and clubs while attending college. Three months after recording a demo with producer Peter Zizzo, she signed with A&M Records.

Her debut single, "A Thousand Miles", reached the top five on the Billboard Hot 100 in 2002. Her debut album, Be Not Nobody, followed and received a platinum certification in the United States. Her subsequent albums, Harmonium (2004) and Heroes & Thieves (2007), failed to match the commercial success of the first. She produced a fourth album, Rabbits on the Run (2011), independently before seeking a record label to release it. Carlton released a Christmas EP titled Hear the Bells in November 2012, and released her fifth studio album, Liberman, on October 23, 2015.

Life and career

Childhood and youth
Carlton was born on August 16, 1980, in Milford, Pennsylvania, the first of three children of Edmund "Ed" Carlton, a pilot, and Heidi Lee, a pianist and school music teacher. She has a sister, Gwen, and a brother, Edmund. Carlton’s mother comes from a Jewish family in Queens, New York.

Her interest in music began at an early age. At the age of two she visited Disneyland, and played "It's a Small World" on the piano when she came home. Her mother began to tutor her, she was introduced to classical music. By the age of 9 she had become passionate about ballet, and in 1994, aged 14, she enrolled at the School of American Ballet. After graduating, she sang in nightclubs and began to feel comfortable on stage. She later moved to New York City, where she attended Columbia University for one year before dropping out and had a stint as a waitress in Hell's Kitchen.

2002–03: Be Not Nobody
Carlton met songwriter/producer Peter Zizzo at a singer-songwriter circle and was invited to his studio to record a demo. Three months later she was signed by Jimmy Iovine to A&M Records and began work on an album of her songs, to be titled Rinse. This album was never released, but a few tracks were reworked for Be Not Nobody. One song, "Carnival", was re-recorded as "Dark Carnival" for the video game SpyHunter 2. Other tracks from Rinse were "Interlude" (later known as "A Thousand Miles"), "Rinse", "Ordinary Days" (later known as "Ordinary Day"), "Twilight", "Pretty Baby", "All I Ask", and "Superhero". The first five of these were included in her first album, Be Not Nobody, together with a cover of the Jagger/Richards song "Paint It Black". Other unreleased tracks from her early demo tapes include "Faces", "Meggie Sue", "Little Mary", "Burden", "Wonder", "Devil Dance", and "Last Fall".

After hearing Carlton's demo of "A Thousand Miles", A&M president Ron Fair  organized recording sessions  and produced and arranged the song himself. "A Thousand Miles" became a hit, peaking in the top five on the Billboard Hot 100, and went on to become the sixth-most-played song of the year. It garnered Grammy Award nominations for "Record of the Year", "Song of the Year", and "Best Instrumental Arrangement Accompanying Vocalist(s)." Fair produced the rest of the album. The tracks were recorded in Los Angeles at IGA Studios, Santa Monica; Henson Studios, Hollywood; and Royaltone Studios, Burbank. Carlton played piano and sang vocals; other instrumentation included a backing band, a 60-piece orchestra and sitar on "Paint It Black".

Be Not Nobody was released in April 2002 and appeared at number five on the Billboard 200 albums chart with 102,000 units sold. It went on to sell more than two million copies worldwide. Two more singles, "Ordinary Day" and "Pretty Baby", were released. Carlton toured the US in 2002 to promote the album, opening for the Goo Goo Dolls and Third Eye Blind, before headlining her own tour at the end of 2002 and touring Europe in 2003.

Carlton collaborated with other artists before the release of her second album. She provided the descant vocals for the Counting Crows song "Big Yellow Taxi", played piano for Italian singer Zucchero, along with Haylie Ecker on violin for the song "Indaco Dagli Occhi Del Cielo", and provided backing vocals for "Moving On" by Kimya Dawson for her album Hidden Vagenda.

2004–05: Harmonium
Carlton's second album, Harmonium was released in November 2004. Harmonium debuted at number 33 on the Billboard 200 and descended quickly after, selling fewer than 150,000 copies by February 2006, which was considered a disappointment after her successful debut. The album was produced by Stephan Jenkins from rock band Third Eye Blind, and included darker themes than those on her debut album. Carlton and Jenkins had met and begun a relationship in mid-2002, when she and Third Eye Blind, of which Jenkins was lead singer, were on tour together. After seeing Carlton perform live Jenkins offered to produce her music, and according to Carlton they decided very quickly that they had the same vision for the album. Carlton credited Jenkins with helping her to withstand pressure from record label executives who wanted to influence the recording. She said later that her label "wasn't very happy" about the decisions she made during the making of the album.

Carlton stated that Harmonium contained more of her own aesthetic than Be Not Nobody. A single, "White Houses", released to radio in late August 2004, peaked at number 86 on the Billboard Hot 100. MTV censored and later banned the single's music video because of a controversial lyric in the song that refers to sexual intercourse. Carlton attributed the censoring of the song to the Super Bowl XXXVIII halftime show controversy involving Janet Jackson which had occurred earlier that year. She embarked on a four-week North American concert tour in October and November 2004, with an opening act of Low Millions, and performed a second tour in March and April the following year, with Cary Brothers and Ari Hest as supporting acts.

Carlton left A&M Records in mid-2005, feeling that her nonconformist attitude would create problems for her at the label. A&M Records had sent Carlton into the recording studio because they wanted to re-release Harmonium, whereas Carlton felt the album should be promoted as it was. She decided to leave the label to find another record deal once promotion for Harmonium had ended. While in the studio she wrote songs with Linda Perry and The Matrix. In the same period she collaborated with the Italian singer Zucchero Fornaciari featuring his song Indaco Dagli Occhi Del Cielo (cover of the well known Everybody's Got to Learn Sometime), together with the violinist Haylie Ecker, in the album Zu & Co.

2006–2008: Heroes and Thieves

In August 2005, Carlton said she was to enter the recording studio the following month with producer Linda Perry, with whom she had previously collaborated after executives at A&M Records sent her into the studio to record a re-release single for Harmonium. The album was influenced by Carlton's breakup with its co-producer, Stephan Jenkins, and Carlton said that one of the reasons they remained friends was that "nothing took precedence over the music ... No matter what was going on in the emotional realm, all we cared about was the album. It created this kinetic environment that was kind of like Fleetwood Mac. It made for better music."

Heroes & Thieves was released and greeted with generally positive reviews. It debuted at number 44 on the U.S. Billboard 200, "Nolita Fairytale" was the first single and peaked at number 26 on Billboard Adult Top 40 Tracks chart. To promote the album, Carlton embarked on the Haunted Club Tour, from November 2 to 24, 2007. Second single "Hands on Me" was sent out to radio in February 2008 and reached number 30 on Billboard Adult Top 40 Tracks chart. One song on the album was "Spring Street", based on Spring Street in SoHo in Manhattan. Carlton parted amicably with The Inc. once her promotional commitments to Heroes & Thieves had passed.

She contributed a stripped-down version of the song "More than This" to Songs for Tibet, an album compiled in support of Tibet to draw attention to its human rights situation. On September 25, 2008, Carlton and several other musicians and scientists departed on a nine-day trip to the Arctic Circle. On behalf of the charity Cape Farewell, they worked alongside researchers for the purpose of studying climate change. Carlton had been a part for PETA's Animal Birth Control Campaign; she owns a long haired dachshund named Lord Victor.

2009–2012: Rabbits on the Run and Hear the Bells

Carlton's fourth studio album Rabbits on the Run was released on July 26, 2011 under Razor & Tie, the third record label she signed with. Before recording the album, Carlton was unsure whether she wanted to make another record or pursue film scoring instead. After deciding to try again, she decided that she needed to record in the ideal environment, choosing to record at Real World Studios Box, England. She chose the title for the symbolism often depicted by rabbits—'time slipping, mind floating'—which is something she has been relating to for the past few years. The album was further inspired by Stephen Hawking's A Brief History of Time and Richard Adams's Watership Down. The dreamy, fantastical sound of the album was achieved by recording direct to tape and features production by Steve Osborne. The first single, "Carousel" was released on May 3. On September 19, a tweet on Carlton's account made by her management stated that "I Don't Want to Be a Bride" would be the next single off the record. Via Twitter, Carlton announced that her label would not produce a video for "I Don't Want to Be a Bride", instead producing one for "Hear the Bells". The music video, which Carlton describes as her most revealing to date, was released on June 7, 2012.

On November 10, a tweet made by Carlton's management announced the upcoming release of her holiday EP titled Hear the Bells on November 21. The EP consists of four tracks, two of which are acoustic versions of Carlton's songs Hear the Bells and A Thousand Miles.

2012–2017: Liberman, Blue Pool, Liberman Live and Earlier Things Live 

Carlton announced in late 2012 that she had returned to Real World Studios to commence work on a new album with a theme of euphoria. She clarified on Twitter that "Euphoria" was not the name of the album, nor was it to be straightforward electronically fabricated.

On a small tour in late 2013, Carlton teased new songs "Willows", "House Of Seven Swords", "A Matter Of Time", "Take It Easy" and "Unlock The Lock".

On February 28, 2014, Carlton announced that she had finished recording the ten-track album, which was to be titled Liberman, and on April 11, 2014 she reported that Liberman was being mastered. Carlton's 2014 summer tour supported the Barefoot Wine Beach Project, which encouraged people to clean the beach and keep it safe for wildlife. She performed a track titled "Willows" to promote the events for Fox New York TV, which she said was about the trees she had loved when she was growing up, and she revealed that Liberman would be released in 2015. In an interview with CBS News published on June 11, 2014, Carlton described the album as "kind of lush, trippy and beautiful...You really feel like you're falling into a rabbit hole of sounds." She said: "It's pretty short, it's 10 songs. It's meant to be listened to through your headphones."

On April 20, 2015, it was announced that Carlton had signed with Dine Alone Records to release Liberman in October 2015. Esquire premiered "Young Heart", a song not expected to be included on the album, which was released as a "pre-release single". On June 15, 2015, Carlton released the song "Blue Pool" through Nylon magazine's website. The song was included on the Blue Pool EP, released digitally on July 24, 2015. The songs on the EP were part of a deluxe version of the Liberman album. On August 3, 2015, Southern Living premiered the official music video for "Blue Pool". On August 27, 2015, USA Today premiered the official lyric video for "Willows". The album artwork for Liberman was revealed, along with its release date of October 23, 2015.

Carlton released Liberman Live on October 21, 2016. The album consisted of eight live tracks recorded in Nashville, Tennessee, while on tour .

On February 17, 2017, Carlton released another live album titled Earlier Things Live via her own Victor Music label. It included six songs from albums that were released pre-Liberman and were played live throughout 2015–2016 on the Liberman tour

2017–present: Cover songs, Love Is an Art and Broadway debut 

Carlton performed a song titled "Love Is An Art" throughout 2017, and stated that this might be the title of her next album. She began writing songs for the album, her sixth, in June 2017. On December 25, 2018 she posted on Instagram saying that she would start recording the album on January 23, 2019.

In March 2018, Carlton began to release one cover song a month while she worked on the album. The first of six songs, a cover of "Call Your Girlfriend" by Robyn, was released digitally March 23, 2018. The second, a cover of Fleetwood Mac's "Dreams" was released April 20, 2018. The third, a cover of Neil Young's "Only Love Can Break Your Heart" was released May 18, 2018. The fourth cover, Fred Neil's "Little Bit of Rain" was released on June 15, 2018. The fifth cover, "Needle in the Hay" by Elliott Smith was released on July 20, 2018. The sixth and final cover song, "Lonely Girls" by Lucinda Williams was released on August 10, 2018. She released the covers EP as a triple vinyl collection, along with the Liberman Live and Earlier Things Live EPs, on November 23, 2018.

In May 2019, Carlton's Instagram page announced that she would be taking over the lead role in the Carole King musical Beautiful for a limited season from June 27. This was Carlton's Broadway debut. On May 27, 2019, Carlton announced via Instagram that her sixth album, produced by Dave Fridmann, was to be titled Love Is an Art. The album was mastered the same day. Love is an Art was released on March 27, 2020.

Carlton revealed via Twitter in January 2021 that she planned to re-release the album in March 2021 with new songs and demo recordings from the album's studio sessions.

Personal life
As a teenager, Carlton suffered from depression and developed anorexia after completing high school. She sought therapy, claimed she managed her depression with medication, and overcame her eating disorder before her first single debuted.

On June 19, 2010, Carlton came out as bisexual while headlining Nashville Pride. She stated to the attending audience, "I've never said this before, but I am a proud bisexual woman."

On October 9, 2013, at a live performance in Bay Shore, New York, Carlton announced that she was expecting her first child with her fiancé John McCauley (of the band Deer Tick). In November, she announced she had experienced an ectopic pregnancy, in which she later suffered a ruptured tube and internal bleeding. After surgery, her entire right fallopian tube was removed. On December 27, 2013, Carlton and McCauley married in a ceremony officiated by Stevie Nicks.

On June 26, 2014, Carlton announced via Facebook that the release of Liberman would be delayed until the summer of 2015 because she was expecting another child with McCauley. On January 13, 2015, Carlton gave birth to their daughter. Carlton lived in Nashville with her family until 2021. She currently lives in Pawtuxet Village, Rhode Island.

Charity work
In 2005, Carlton completed the New York City Marathon and donated the pledge money she collected to Musicians on Call, a nonprofit organization that brings live and recorded music to patients' bedsides.

Discography

 Be Not Nobody (2002)
 Harmonium (2004)
 Heroes & Thieves (2007) 
 Rabbits on the Run (2011)
 Liberman (2015)
 Love Is an Art (2020)

References

External links

Living people
21st-century American women pianists
21st-century American pianists
21st-century American women singers
21st-century American singers
American women pop singers
American women singer-songwriters
American pop pianists
Bisexual songwriters
Bisexual singers
Bisexual women
Columbia University alumni
LGBT people from New York (state)
LGBT people from Pennsylvania
LGBT people from Tennessee
American LGBT singers
American LGBT songwriters
School of American Ballet alumni
People from Hell's Kitchen, Manhattan
People from Milford, Pennsylvania
Singers from New York City
Singer-songwriters from Pennsylvania
A&M Records artists
Murder Inc. Records artists
Razor & Tie artists
Universal Motown Records artists
1980 births
20th-century American LGBT people
21st-century American LGBT people
Singer-songwriters from New York (state)
American bisexual writers